This is a compendium of the lesser known Great Old Ones of the Cthulhu Mythos of H. P. Lovecraft.


Overview

In Joseph S. Pulver's novel Nightmare's Disciple several new Great Old Ones and Elder Gods are named. The novel mentions D'numl Cthulhu's female cousin, T'ith and Xu'bea, The Teeth of the Dark Plains of Mwaalba. Miivls and Vn'Vulot, are said to have fought each other in southern Gondwanaland during the Cretaceous period, whereas Rynvyk, regarded as one of the mates of Cthulhu's sister Kassogtha, likely matches with Cthulhu itself or a similar entity. Kassogtha would have sired Rynvyk three sons (one named Ult) and Rynvyk himself currently rests in a crimson pool in the Hall of Tyryar (likely another name or dimension of R'lyeh), whose portal is located somewhere in Norway.

A

Aphoom-Zhah

Aphoom-Zhah (the Cold Flame) debuted in Lin Carter's short story "The Acolyte of the Flame" (1985)—although the being was first mentioned in an earlier tale by Carter, "The Horror in the Gallery" (1976). Aphoom-Zhah is also mentioned in Carter's "The Light from the Pole" (1980), a story Carter wrote from an early draft by Clark Ashton Smith. Smith later developed this draft into "The Coming of the White Worm" (1941).

Aphoom-Zhah is the progeny of Cthugha and is worshipped as the Lord of the Pole because he dwells, like Ithaqua, above the Arctic Circle. Aphoom-Zhah frequently visited Hyperborea during the last ice age. His legend is chronicled in the Pnakotic Manuscripts.

Aphoom-Zhah appears as a vast, cold, grey flame that freezes whatever it touches. The being came to Earth from the star Fomalhaut, briefly visiting the planet Yaksh (Neptune) before taking up residence in Mount Yarak, a legendary mountain atop the North Pole. When the Elder Gods tried to imprison him beneath the pole, Aphoom-Zhah erupted with such fury that he froze the lands around him. Aphoom-Zhah is believed to be responsible for the glaciation that eventually overwhelmed Hyperborea, Zobna, and Lomar.

Aphoom-Zhah likely spawned Gnoph-Keh, Rhan-Tegoth, and Voorm. Though no human cult worships this being, Aphoom-Zhah is revered by the Gnophkeh, the Voormi, and his own race of minions; the spectral Ylidheem.

Atlach-Nacha

See Clark Ashton Smith deities.

B

Basatan

See Clark Ashton Smith deities.

Bokrug

Bokrug (The Great Water Lizard) first appeared in Lovecraft's short story "The Doom That Came to Sarnath" (1920). The being is also part of Lovecraft's Dream Cycle.

Bokrug is the god of the semi-amphibian Thuum'ha of Ib, in the land of Mnar. The deity slept beneath the calm waters of a lake which bordered both Ib and the city of Sarnath. When the humans of Sarnath cruelly slaughtered the populace of Ib and stole the god's idol, the deity was awakened. Each year thereafter, strange ripples disturbed the otherwise placid lake. On the one-thousandth anniversary of Ib's destruction, Bokrug rose up and destroyed Sarnath (so utterly that not even ruins remained). Afterwards, the Thuum'ha recolonized Ib and henceforth lived undisturbed.

C

Chaugnar Faugn
Some were the figures of well-known myth — gorgons, chimaeras, dragons, cyclops, and all their shuddersome congeners. Others were drawn from darker and more furtively whispered cycles of subterranean legend — black, formless Tsathoggua, many-tentacled Cthulhu, proboscidian Chaugnar Faugn, and other rumoured blasphemies from forbidden books like the Necronomicon, the Book of Eibon, or the Unaussprechlichen Kulten of von Junzt.
—H. P. Lovecraft, "The Horror in the Museum" (emphasis added)

Chaugnar Faugn (The Elephant God, The Horror from the Hills) was created by Frank Belknap Long and first appeared in his novel The Horror from the Hills (1931).

Chaugnar Faugn (or Chaugnar Faughn) appears as a horribly grotesque idol, made of an unknown element, combining the worst aspects of octopus, elephant, and human being. When Chaugnar Faugn hungers, he can move incredibly quickly for his size, and use his lamprey-like "trunk" to drain the blood from any organism he encounters.

Chaugnar Faugn came to Earth from another dimension eons ago, possibly in a form other than the one which he later assumed. Upon arriving, he found the dominant lifeforms to be only simple amphibians. From these creatures, he created the Miri Nigri to be his servitors. The Miri Nigri would later mate with early humans to produce hybrids that would eventually evolve into the horrid Tcho-Tcho people.

Cthugha

Cthugha is a fictional deity in the Cthulhu Mythos genre of horror fiction, the creation of August Derleth. In Derleth's version of the Cthulhu Mythos, Cthugha is a Great Old One, an elemental spirit of fire opposed to the Elder Gods. Derleth set its homeworld as the star Fomalhaut, which had featured in Lovecraft's poetry. He first appeared in Derleth's short story "The House on Curwen Street" (1944). Cthugha resembles a giant ball of fire. He is served by the Flame Creatures of Cthugha. Fthaggua, regent of the fire vampires, may be his progeny. He has at least one other known progeny, the being known as Aphoom-Zhah.

Cthulhu

See Cthulhu.

Cthylla

Cthylla (the Secret Daughter of Cthulhu) is a fictional character in the Cthulhu Mythos of H. P. Lovecraft. Cthylla was created by Brian Lumley, who originally mentioned her in his Titus Crow novel The Transition Of Titus Crow (1975), though he never actually described her. Tina L. Jens, however, depicted Cthylla as a gigantic winged-octopus in her short story "In His Daughter's Darkling Womb" (1997).

Cynothoglys

Cynothoglys (The Mortician God) first appeared in Thomas Ligotti's short story "The Prodigy of Dreams" (1994). The being appears as a shapeless, multiform entity with a single arm used for catching those who summoned her, and bringing them a painless, ecstatic death. In ancient times, she once held a small cult in Italy, which paid her homage rather than worshiping her, since actual worship would be the same as summoning the god. They considered her to be no mere Cloacina, but the mortician of all creatures, even the gods themselves.

D

Dweller in the Gulf

Dagon

See Clark Ashton Smith deities.
Dáci

E

Eihort

See Ramsey Campbell deities.

G

Gloon

Gloon first appeared in H.P. Lovecraft's short story "The Temple" as a Dionysian statue. Whether Lovecraft intended the statue to be anything other than the centerpiece of a piece of weird fiction is debatable. In 2004, Chaosium released an expanded bestiary to the Mythos which included the entity of Gloon, attributing some non-canonical eldritch and limacine attributes to the entity, a counterpoint to its outwardly pleasing and homoerotic aesthetic. Author Molly Tanzer's novelette "The Infernal History of the Ivybridge Twins" expanded upon Gloon's cult and mythology.

H

Hastur

See Hastur.

M

Morrick

See Brian Lumley deities.

N

Nug and Yeb

Nug (The parent of Cthulhu) and Yeb, the Twin Blasphemies, are the spawn of Shub-Niggurath and Yog-Sothoth. Nug is the parent of Cthulhu and the parent of Kthanid via the influence of Yog-Sothoth. Nug is a god among ghouls, while Yeb is the leader of Abhoth's alien cult.
Both Nug and Yeb closely resemble Shub-Niggurath.

The names Nug and Yeb are similar to the names of the Egyptian sibling gods Nut and Geb, members of the Heliopolitan Ennead.

Nyogtha

See Henry Kuttner deities.

Nyarlathotep

See Nyarlathotep

O

Oorn

See Brian Lumley deities.

Q

Quachil Uttaus

See Clark Ashton Smith deities.

R

Rlim Shaikorth

See Clark Ashton Smith deities.

Rhan-Tegoth
A weakened, amphibious, chimaera-like being that crushed its victims and sucked their blood. Revived and worshipped by the mad wax artist George Rogers.

Rhogog
The Bearer of the Cup of the Blood of the Ancients, taking the form of a black leafless oak tree, hot to the touch, that bears Cthulhu's blood.

S

Shudde M'ell

See Brian Lumley deities.

Summanus

See Brian Lumley deities.

U

The Unimaginable Horror

The Unimaginable Horror appears in CT Phipps' Cthulhu Armageddon (2016) sequel The Tower of Zhaal (2017). It is a mammoth version of the creature from The Colour Out of Space that destroyed the Kastro'vaal civilization. It proceeded to arrive on Earth in primordial times before it was imprisoned in the oceans by Cthulhu's people. From there, it escaped and destroyed much of the Yitian civilization before being imprisoned again by a member of their race called Zhaal. The creature would remain imprisoned well after the rest of the Great Old Ones had arisen and only briefly escape before being restored to its imprisonment. It is written about in a book called The Unimaginable Horror that reveals details about the Tower of Zhaal and its origins.

V

Vulthoom

See Clark Ashton Smith deities.

W

The Worm that Gnaws in the Night

The Worm that Gnaws in the Night (the Doom of Shaggai) appears in Lin Carter's short story "Shaggai" (1971). The being is portrayed as an enormous, worm-like entity. It was first observed by the wizard Eibon, who chanced upon it on a journey to the planet of Shaggai. To his amazement, Eibon discovered that the massive worm was the "Dweller in the Pyramid" mentioned by the demon Pharol, when questioned by Eibon (about a cryptic passage in the Pnakotic Manuscripts), and that once the Shan of Shaggai made the mistake of summoning it, they could not control or even send it back. Even the Elder Gods could not deal with it. The worm, to Eibon's horror, was slowly eating away at the vitals of Shaggai and he subsequently made a hasty return to Earth. Shaggai, however, eventually suffered a different fate from something that crawled over the edge of the universe, as related in Campbell's "The Insects from Shaggai".

Y

Yag-Kosha
Yag-Kosha is described as a telepathic being with an elephant head, from outer space and being the last survivor of a group of refugees.

Yag-Kosha appeared in the story "The Tower of the Elephant", from Robert Ervin Howard (the creator of "Kull" and "Conan, the Barbarian"). The Tower of the Elephant was best known for being portrayed in the comic book Conan the Barbarian#4.

Yba'sokug
Yba'sokug is a great beast that is said to be come to devour the world, sending depravity before him in the form of his heralds. He is depicted as a froglike creature with a great multitude of eyes. Yba'sokug is worshiped fervently by "the lonely and the tired".

Yibb-Tstll
See Brian Lumley deities.

Yig
Yig (the Father of Serpents) first appeared in the story The Curse of Yig which was created by Zealia Bishop and almost completely rewritten by H. P. Lovecraft. He is a deity that appears as a serpent man, serpent with bat like wings, or as a giant snake. Although Yig is easy to anger, he is easy to please as well. Yig often sends his serpent minions, the children of Yig, to destroy or transform his enemies. He is associated with the Serpent Men.

To Native Americans, Yig is regarded as "bad medicine". He is also alluded to in western American folklore. He is identified with the Mesoamerican deity Quetzalcoatl, and may be a prototype for that god and other serpentine gods worldwide. Some authors identify him as the Stygian serpent god Set's father, and from Robert E. Howard's Conan stories, and also with the Great Serpent worshiped by the Serpent People of Valusia from Howard's Kull stories.

Yig is the subject of a song by the shock rock band GWAR entitled "Horror of Yig", which appears on their album Scumdogs of the Universe. The band The Darkest of the Hillside Thickets, famous for their Lovecraft references, also refers to Yig in a song titled "Yig Snake Daddy".

Yig is the name of a deity in the Arcanis Dungeons & Dragons campaign setting.  Yig was once (and may still be) worshipped by the Ssethregorean Empire, a group dominated by various lizard and snake-like beings.  Yig in this mythos is a female deity, but still strongly associated with serpents, suggesting the name is not a coincidence.

Despite being spoken of on only a few occasions in Lovecraft's work, Yig is one of the Ancient Ones included in the Arkham Horror boardgame, appearing alongside Ancients such as Cthulhu and Nyarlathotep, proving his popularity.

Z

Zathog

Zathog appears in Richard Tierney's novel The Winds of Zarr (1971), as well as in his short story "From Beyond the Stars" (1975). After warring with the Elder Gods, Zathog, eager for revenge, entered into a compact with the brutal Zarr. The Zarr controlled most of the galaxy where they dwelt, and desired to conquer the rest of the universe. In return for helping him free his brethren, Zathog promised to give the Zarr the ability to travel through time and space.

Zushakon

See Henry Kuttner deities.

See also
 See Great Old One#Table for detailed bibliographical information (under References).

References

Notes

Cthulhu Mythos deities
Lists of fictional deities